KRLL is a Country formatted broadcast radio station.  The station is licensed to California, Missouri and serves California and Moniteau County in Missouri.  KRLL is owned and operated by Moniteau Communications, Inc.

References

External links
 Real Country 1420 Online
 

1984 establishments in Missouri
Country radio stations in the United States
Radio stations established in 1984
RLL